Omar Hamid Ali (born February 10, 1971) is a historian of the African diaspora who specializes in the history of independent black political movements in the United States, Islam in the Indian Ocean world, and black resistance to slavery in Latin America.

Life
Ali is of East Indian and Peruvian background. He is Professor of Comparative African Diaspora History and Dean of Lloyd International Honors College at the University of North Carolina, Greensboro. He is on the faculty of the African American and African Diaspora Studies Program, History Department, and International & Global Studies at UNCG. He has also been a Fulbright professor of history and anthropology at Universidad Nacional de Colombia, a visiting professor in the Program for African American and Diaspora Studies at Vanderbilt University, and a Library Scholar at the David Rockefeller Center for Latin American Studies at Harvard University. A graduate of the London School of Economics and Political Science, he studied anthropology at the School of Oriental and African Studies and conducted fieldwork in West Africa with anthropologist Maxwell Owusu before receiving his Ph.D. in history from Columbia University in 2003 under the direction of Eric Foner. Ali is the author of four books, including Malik Ambar: Power and Slavery Across the Indian Ocean World (Oxford University Press, 2016) and In the Lion's Mouth: Black Populism in the New South (University Press of Mississippi, 2010), and wrote the narrative for The African Diaspora in the Indian Ocean World exhibit for the Schomburg Center for Research in Black Culture in collaboration with curator Sylviane Diouf. Selected as the 2016 Carnegie Foundation North Carolina Professor of the Year, he serves as a Road Scholar for the North Carolina Humanities Council and History and Geography Deputy Inspector for the French Ministry of Education; he has also served on the History Academic Advisory Committee of the College Board and the Teaching Prize Committee for the World History Association. He is member of the board of directors of the All Stars Project, IndependentVoting.org, and the Cone Health Foundation. His media appearances include CNN, NPR, Al Jazeera, Telemundo, C-SPAN, and PBS, among other networks.

Selected bibliography
Malik Ambar: Power and Slavery Across the Indian Ocean (New York: Oxford University Press, 2016)
Islam in the Indian Ocean World: A Brief History with Documents (Boston, MA: Bedford St. Martin's Press, 2016)
"Afro-Peru: A Legacy of Black Labor and Culture," Revista: Harvard Review of Latin America, Vol. XIII, No. 4 (Fall 2014)
"Benkos Biohó: African Maroon Leadership in New Grenada", in Atlantic Biographies: Individuals and Peoples in the Atlantic World, M. Meuwese and J. Fortin, eds (Boston, MA: Brill, 2013)
"The African Diaspora in Latin America: Afro-Peru and San Martin de Porres," New African Review, Vol. 2, Issue 4 (Summer 2013)
"The Mu'azzin's Song: Islam and the African Diaspora of the Indian Ocean," North Carolina Conversations, Vol. 6, Issue 1 (Winter-Spring, 2012)
"Re-Conceptualizing Black Populism" in Southern Populism Revisited: New Interpretations and New Departures, James M. Beeby eds. (Jackson: University Press of Mississippi, 2012)
"Black Populism: Agrarian Politics from the Colored Alliance to the People's Party" in Beyond Forty Acres and a Mule: African American Farmers Since Reconstruction, Debra A. Reid and Evan P. Bennett, eds. (Gainesville: University Press of Florida, 2012) 
"Fulani's Tools and Results," Palimpsest: A Journal on Women, Gender and the Black International, Vol. 1, No. 1 (Spring 2012) 
"The African Diaspora in the Indian Ocean World," Schomburg Center for Research in Black Culture (The New York Public Library, 2011)
In the Lion's Mouth: Black Populism in the New South, 1886-1900 (Jackson: University Press of Mississippi, 2010), foreword by Robin D. G. Kelley
"Islam, Trade, and Empire", in Africa and the Wider World, by Hakeem Tijani, Raphael Njoku, et al., eds. (Boston, MA: Pearson, 2010)
"Lenora Branch Fulani: Challenging the Rules of the Game", in African Americans and the Presidency: The Road to the White House, B. Glasrud, et al., eds. (New York: Routledge, 2010)
"Islam and the African Diaspora in the Indian Ocean World", in Black Past: Remembered and Reclaimed (2009)
In the Balance of Power: Independent Black Politics and Third Party Movements in the United States (Athens: Ohio University Press, 2008), foreword by Eric Foner
"Standing Guard at the Door of Liberty: Black Populism in South Carolina, 1886-1897," South Carolina Historical Magazine, Vol. 107, No. 3 (July 2006)
"Independent Black Politics", editor, Souls: A Critical Journal of Black Politics, Culture, and Society Vol. 7, No. 2 (Spring 2005).

References

External links
 The University of North Carolina, Greensboro, faculty website
 Carnegie Foundation announcement of NC Professor of the Year
 North Carolina Humanities Council
 Campus Weekly

1971 births
Living people
Historians of the United States
Black studies scholars
Columbia Graduate School of Arts and Sciences alumni
Alumni of the London School of Economics
21st-century American historians
21st-century American male writers
American male non-fiction writers